MTV Satellite Radio was a part of the XM Satellite Radio service from 2001 until September 30, 2005. The studios were located in Times Square in the Paramount Plaza building at the corner of Broadway and 50th Street in New York City.

The station provided content from MTV Shows as well as original programming.

Personalities 
Program Director: John Gill

Host, Assistant Program Director, & Senior Producer: Evan James (Currently a Senior Producer for SiriusXM Radio in New York & a Music Journalist for various outlets)

Host, Producer, & Writer: Kim Kane (Currently hosting on Power 105.1 in New York)

Host & Director of Production: John Kurtiss (Presently Creative Services Director for Howard 100 and Howard 101 on Sirius Satellite Radio)

Host & Production Assistant: K-Pop

External links
 XM Radio - XM Satellite Radio Online
  - Kim Kane

Defunct radio networks in the United States
Radio stations established in 2001
Radio stations disestablished in 2005